François Fertiault (25 June 1814 – 5 October 1915) was a French novelist, poet, essayist, and writer of children's literature.

Biography

Early life
Fertiault was born in Verdun-sur-le-Doubs, in département Saône-et-Loire, located in central eastern France. His father was a soldier who combatted under Napoléon and died during the German Campaign of 1813. Thanks to the help provided by his uncle and a clerk, François Fertiault attended a school in Chalon-sur-Saône since 1820, where he graduated Baccalauréat at the age of 20.

Early career
During his school years, Fertiault's literary drafts proved to be promising; Fertiault was immediately hired within the editorial board of the newspaper Patriote de Saône-et-Loire and starts working as a literary critic. Then, he settled in Paris, where he worked in the printing house Donbey-Dupré from August 8, 1835. In 1836, he is hired as a secretary in a bank in Bischoffsheim, in département Bas-Rhin, in north-eastern France. He worked there until the French Revolution of 1848.

Publishing
François Fertiault after married Julie Rodde, supported his wife in his literary works, and published several books with her.

Fertiault and his wife settled in Paris a few years later. There, they work as publishers of the periodical Feuilleton de Paris, and then of the Bulletin de Paris between 1858 and 1864. Besides his author career, Fertiault was also a literary critic until the end of his life, mainly dealing with modern and contemporary literature. Thanks to Alphonse Lemerre, Fertiault joined the Parnassianism move and collaborated to the redaction of the famous anthology Le Parnasse contemporain. Fertiault also corresponded with the Norman poet Alexandre Piédagnel.

Personal life
Fertiault's wife, Julie, was the daughter of journalist Victor Rodde (1792-1835), he had married her in 1841, and she died in 1900. Their only child died during  early childhood; in 1956 Fertiault retired progressively from his literary career and died at the age of 101, on October 5 in Paris.

Works
Novels and tales
 Arthur ou le dîner de sept châtelains, 1837
 Au clair pays, 1897
 Le dix-neuvième siècle. Satires, 1840 (with Eugène Nus)
 Les imperceptibles, 1903
 Les voix amies, 1864 (with Julie Rodde)

Poems
 Intimes et familières, 1907
 Le poème des larmes 1858 (with his wife Julie Rodde)
 Rimes bourguignones, 1899
 Sympathies, 1898

Children and youth books
 La bonne étoile, 1845
 En Bourgogne, 1898
 La chambre aux histoires, 1874
 Pâquerettes et boutons d'or, 1844
 Le petits drames rustiques, 1875

Essays
 Les amoureux du livre, Claudin, Paris, 1877.
 Dictionnaire du langage populaire Verduno-Chalonnais, Bouillon, Paris, 1898.
 Les drames et cancans du livre, Lemerre, Paris, 1900.
 Les légendes du livre, Claudin, Paris, 1886.
 Les mystères du destin, Lemerre, Paris, 1888 (published under the anagram « Cranisof Altifuret »).
 La vie du livre, Lemerre, Paris, 1909.

Legacy
In Verdun-sur-le-Doubs, Fertiault's natal village, a street is named "François Fertiault".

References

Bibliography
  J. Richardot: François Fertiault. In: Michel Prevost: Dictionnaire de biographie française, Letouzey & Ané, Paris, Bd. 13 (1975), p. 1186 f.
  Maurice Du Bos: Une poète bibliophile. François Fertiault, Boucheron & Vesseley, Paris, 1905.
  Gilbert Froidure d'Aubigné: Les hommes de notre temps. Édition „Journal du Parlement“, Paris, 1905, p. 135.
  Alphonse Lemerre: Le Parnasse contemporain, Lemerre, Paris, 1866.
  Robert Sabatier, Histoire de la poésie française : Poésie du XIXe siècle, vol. 2, Albin Michel, 1977, 544 p., p. 350

External links

1814 births
People from Saône-et-Loire
20th-century French poets
1915 deaths
French centenarians
Men centenarians